Pastor Pedro Velázquez Hernández (April 28, 1895 – December 26, 1960), was a watercolor painter praised for his technique and beauty in all his works in the genres of landscape, portraiture and still life, with successful exhibitions in San Francisco and New York, in the United States. He also had success in the first biennial of Barcelona, Spain. He is recognized for being the creator of the coat of arms of the State of New Mexico.

References

20th-century Mexican painters
Mexican male painters
Mexican emigrants to the United States
1895 births
1960 deaths
20th-century Mexican male artists